Aleksei Nikolayevich Gerasimov (born 27 June 1999) is a Russian football player who plays for FC Zorkiy Krasnogorsk.

Club career
He made his debut in the Russian Football National League for FC Shinnik Yaroslavl on 6 October 2018 in a game against FC Tambov as an added-time substitute for Sergey Samodin.

References

External links
 Profile by Russian Football National League
 

1999 births
Footballers from Yaroslavl
Living people
Russian footballers
Association football forwards
FC Shinnik Yaroslavl players
FC Znamya Truda Orekhovo-Zuyevo players